For playoff quarterback touchdown record see List of National Football League playoffs career passing touchdowns leaders.

The first official National Football League (NFL) playoff game was the 1933 NFL Championship Game between the Chicago Bears and New York Giants. A "playoff" game was played in 1932 between the Chicago Bears and Portsmouth Spartans to break a regular season tie, but is recorded in the team record books as a regular season game. Since then there have been a total over 525 NFL playoff games including games from the AFL, but not the AAFC. The following list shows career postseason records for each starting quarterback in the NFL playoffs.

Wins or losses are credited to the quarterback who started the game for each team, even if he was injured or failed to complete the game.

Note: from 1933 to 1949 some offenses did not employ a quarterback in the modern sense of the position. Listed below are the "primary passers" for those games, the players that passed the ball most in those games. They may not have actually started the game at quarterback. This format allows Hall of Fame quarterbacks like Sid Luckman and Sammy Baugh to maintain credit for their team's playoff records since they were obviously the top passer for their team. The players involved in such games are marked with an asterisk (*).

Champion starters

The following 56 quarterbacks have led their team to an NFL or American Football League (AFL) title. Super Bowls before the 1970 AFL–NFL merger are not included in total championship count.

† is a member of the Pro Football Hall of Fame

 1 Graham also won four AAFC championships with the Cleveland Browns prior to the NFL/AAFC merger.

Winning starters

Joe Flacco and Tom Brady are tied for the most road post-season  wins (7), not including Super Bowls, which are played at a neutral site. For players with five or more playoff appearances, Bart Starr holds the record for the highest winning percentage, (.900) and is second for the record for most championships (five NFL titles plus two Super Bowl wins vs. AFL teams) to Tom Brady, who has won seven Super Bowls. Seven quarterbacks are undefeated in post-season play but all of them have just a single appearance as a starter except for Frank Reich who had two starts. Hall of Fame quarterback Y. A. Tittle shares the record with Andy Dalton for the highest number of playoff starts without ever winning a game (4). John Elway holds the record for the highest number of playoff wins before eventually winning his first Super Bowl (10).  Donovan McNabb and Jim Kelly hold the record for the highest number of playoff wins (9) without winning the Super Bowl.

This table lists all quarterbacks who have won a playoff game in the NFL or the AFL.
Sort chart by clicking on heading. Reload page to return to original form.
Sorting 'Teams' in ascending order will list all champion quarterbacks for each team first and in the order they won the title game for their team.

From 1933 to 1969, NFL Champs are listed.
From 1960 to 1969, AFL Champs are listed.
Super Bowls listed after 1970 NFL-AFL merger.

† is a member of the Pro Football Hall of Fame

Updated through the championship games.

Remaining starters

The following quarterbacks have started in at least one playoff game, but have not earned a win.

Updated through the 2022 season.

See also
List of National Football League playoffs career passing touchdowns leaders
List of NFL franchise post-season streaks
List of NFL franchise post-season droughts
Most wins by a starting quarterback (NFL)
List of National Football League head coaches by playoff record

References

Q
Wins
National Football League lists